Cercopithecine gammaherpesvirus 14 (CeHV-14) is a species of virus in the genus Lymphocryptovirus, subfamily Gammaherpesvirinae, family Herpesviridae, and order Herpesvirales.

References

External links
 

Gammaherpesvirinae